Lubiechowo  is a village in the administrative district of Gmina Kamieniec, within Grodzisk Wielkopolski County, Greater Poland Voivodeship, in west-central Poland.

The village has a population of 292.

References

Lubiechowo